6 Days is a 2017 action thriller film directed by Toa Fraser and written by Glenn Standring. A British-New Zealand production, it is based on the 1980 Iranian Embassy siege in London and stars Jamie Bell, Abbie Cornish, Mark Strong and Martin Shaw.

The siege situation is presented from three perspectives: that of negotiator Max Vernon (Mark Strong), SAS leader Rusty Firmin (Jamie Bell) and BBC news reporter Kate Adie (Abbie Cornish). The film was released on 4 August 2017 to mixed reviews and was subsequently streamed by Netflix.

Plot
On Day 1, 30 April 1980, six Iranian Arabs storm the Iranian Embassy located at 16 Princes Gate, Kensington in London and hold at least 26 hostages. Notable persons have been summoned by the incident, including SAS members led by Lance Corporal Rusty Firmin, BBC reporter Kate Adie, and Chief Inspector Max Vernon of the Metropolitan Police. The authorities receive a call from the terrorists' leader, Salim, demanding the release of 91 Arab prisoners in Iran, or else they will kill a hostage at noon the following day.

On Day 2, Max negotiates with Salim by phone, saying that Max will help him by any means to avoid violence. The SAS team prepares to storm the building just before noon, but Salim releases one hostage, due to illness. After Max brings food to the terrorists, Salim reluctantly agrees to extend the deadline by 48 hours, demanding safe passage to Heathrow Airport accompanied by ambassadors from the Arab League.

On Days 3 and 4, Salim calls again, demanding to speak with the ambassadors. Salim's right-hand man, Faisal, takes one hostage to be killed. However, the Iranian authorities refuse to be part of the negotiation. Salim calls Max, demanding to speak to the BBC, and Max reluctantly agrees. Afterwards, Salim reluctantly releases another hostage. Meanwhile, the SAS team prepare a plan for rescuing the hostages while they are aboard the bus en route to the airport, but this plan is vetoed by the Prime Minister, who is adamant that the government will not give in to any of the terrorists' demands, even cosmetically. Reluctantly, the SAS return to the original plan of storming the building.

On Day 5, as per Salim's demand, the BBC World Service broadcasts the terrorists' statement, giving the reason for their actions as the oppression by the Iranian government in Arabistan. Hearing the news, Salim thanks Max and releases two hostages.

On Day 6, Faisal kills a hostage after the demand of bringing the bus is not met. With that, Home Secretary Whitelaw authorises the SAS operation and Vernon is instructed to do anything to stall or distract the terrorists from the assault.

During the assault, led by Firmin, Salim and three of the other terrorists are killed, at the cost of one of the hostages and none of the SAS men, although one is badly burned on his left leg. While the hostages are being led outside, Firmin recognises Faisal hiding among them and shoots him in the stomach before Faisal can use a grenade. Outside the Embassy, the hostages are detained and searched, revealing the sixth and last terrorist trying to hide among them, and he is arrested. A shaken Vernon telephones his wife to reassure her that he is safe, and the SAS team rides back to Hereford, hearing the Prime Minister's effusive praise of them and the Metropolitan Police on the radio.

Cast

Reception
The site's critical consensus reads, "6 Days effectively unravels its fact-based tale in the form of a taut -- albeit unambitious -- thriller that captures its era with a minimum of flair." On Metacritic, the film has a score of 36 out of 100 based on reviews from 7 critics, indicating "Generally unfavorable reviews".

The Guardian described the film as "thoughtful, well-made, with a couple of excellent performances – and just a bit dull. ... The best scenes involve the SAS".

The Times gave it 4 stars and wrote the story "is given the action-movie treatment in this pleasing and unexpectedly thoughtful drama."

Radio Times gave it 4 stars and wrote it provided "us with a taut, detailed thriller that re-creates a significant chapter in the history of international terrorism."

Television journalist Kate Adie who covered the siege for BBC TV offered a positive comment about the accuracy of the presentation of her role. Journalism is not always presented so accurately in the popular media, she said. So, "in a way, this film shows something which was so unusual and it really gets it. It really does".

See also 
 List of New Zealand films

References

External links
 

2017 films
2017 action thriller films
British action thriller films
Films about terrorism
Films about hostage takings
Films about the Special Air Service
2010s English-language films
Political films based on actual events
New Zealand action thriller films
2010s political thriller films
Films set in London
Films shot in London
English-language Netflix original films
2010s British films